Cucamonga is a compilation album consisting of songs recorded with the involvement of Frank Zappa and Paul Buff at Pal Recording Studio in 1963-1964. In 2004, Rhino Records re-released the album with extra tracks and a new track order, after acquiring Del-Fi. The two songs performed by Paul Buff and the two songs performed by the Pauls have no Zappa involvement.

Track listing 1998 version
 "Dear Jeepers" – Bob Guy
 "World's Greatest Sinner" – Baby Ray & The Ferns
 "How's Your Bird" – Baby Ray & The Ferns
 "Every Time I See You" – The Heartbreakers
 "Cradle Rock" – The Heartbreakers
 "Slow Bird" – Paul Buff
 "Blind Man's Buff" – Paul Buff
 "Mr. Clean" – Mr. Clean
 "Jesse Lee" – Mr. Clean
 "Cathy My Angel" – The Pauls
 "'Til September" – The Pauls
 "Heavies" – The Rotations
 "The Cruncher" – The Rotations
 "Letter from Jeepers" – Bob Guy

Track listing 2004 version
 Dear Jeepers - Bob Guy
 Memories of El Monte - The Penguins 	
 How's Your Bird? - Baby Ray & The Ferns 	
 World's Greatest Sinner - Baby Ray & The Ferns 	
 Everytime I See You - The Heartbreakers
 Cradle Rock - The Heartbreakers 	
 Slow Bird - Paul Buff 	
 Blind Man's Buff - Paul Buff 	
 Tijuana Surf - The Hollywood Persuaders 	
 Grunion Run - The Hollywood Persuaders 	
 Mr. Clean - Mr. Clean 	
 Jessie Lee - Mr. Clean 	
 Cathy My Angel - The Pauls 	
 'Til September - The Pauls 	
 Heavies - The Rotations 	
 The Cruncher - The Rotations 	
 Letter from Jeepers - Bob Guy

References

1998 compilation albums
Compilation albums published posthumously
Del-Fi Records compilation albums
Frank Zappa compilation albums
Rhino Records compilation albums